Somercotes Academy (formerly Birkbeck School) is a mixed secondary school located in North Somercotes, near Louth in Lincolnshire, England. It draws its pupils from largely deprived rural and coastal areas within a 20-mile radius, many travelling by bus for over an hour each way to and from school.

History
It opened in 1964 as North Somercotes Secondary Modern School. It was renamed after the Director of Education of Lindsey from 1936 to 1964, Frederick John Birkbeck (4 July 1901 - 24 October 1981), in the late 1960s.

It was previously a foundation school administered by Lincolnshire County Council, Birkbeck School converted to academy status in November 2015 and was renamed Somercotes Academy. The school is now part of the Tollbar Multi Academy Trust (which includes Tollbar Academy and Cleethorpes Academy). However Somercotes Academy continues to coordinate with Lincolnshire County Council for admissions.

Curriculum
The school follows the National Curriculum in Years 7-9, setting students by ability in some subjects. In Years 10 & 11, it offers national diplomas in ICT, Creative & Media, Engineering and Hair & Beauty as an alternative to traditional GCSE courses, as well as a range of foundation courses and the extended project qualification.

In 2012, 42% of all pupils attained five GCSEs grade A* to C including English and mathematics, placing it in the bottom 40% of similar schools' results, and in the bottom 40% of all schools.

Extracurricular activities
The school runs art, ICT, music and science clubs at lunchtime and after school, an after school fitness club, and offers the Duke of Edinburgh's Award Scheme to pupils.

It fields competitive sports teams in Badminton, Cricket, Football and Hockey.

References

Academies in Lincolnshire
East Lindsey District
Educational institutions established in 1964
1964 establishments in England
Secondary schools in Lincolnshire